Sar Asiab-e Pain may refer to:
 Sar Asiab-e Pain, Fars
 Sar Asiab-e Pain, Kerman
 Sar Asiab-e Pain, Razavi Khorasan